Debbie Dunn (born 26 March 1978) is an American sprinter, who specializes in the 400 metres. Originally from Jamaica, she attended Fairmont Heights High School in Maryland, then Norfolk State University, and became an American citizen in 2004.

At the 2009 World Championships in Athletics Dunn set a personal best of 49.95 seconds to qualify for the 400 metres world final. She was a little slower in the final, however, and finished in sixth place. In the 4 x 400 m relay event she finally outpaced everybody, grabbing the gold medal together with teammates Allyson Felix, Lashinda Demus and Sanya Richards.

One year later, at the 2010 World Indoor Championships in Doha, Dunn achieved her first major individual victory by becoming 400 metres world indoor champion. She earned a second gold medal for the 4 x 400 m relay, in which the U.S. team consisting of Dunn, DeeDee Trotter, Natasha Hastings and Allyson Felix finished in 3:27.34.

In July 2012, it was announced that she tested positive for a banned substance. In September 2012 she was given a two-year suspension.

Personal bests
 200 metres – 22.73 s (2009)
 400 metres – 49.64 s (2010)

References

External links
 

1978 births
Living people
American female sprinters
Jamaican emigrants to the United States
American sportspeople in doping cases
Doping cases in athletics
Jamaican female sprinters
Athletes (track and field) at the 2007 Pan American Games
Norfolk State University alumni
World Athletics Championships medalists
Pan American Games bronze medalists for the United States
Pan American Games medalists in athletics (track and field)
People from Landover, Maryland
Sportspeople from the Washington metropolitan area
Track and field athletes from Maryland
USA Outdoor Track and Field Championships winners
USA Indoor Track and Field Championships winners
World Athletics Indoor Championships winners
IAAF Continental Cup winners
World Athletics Indoor Championships medalists
World Athletics Championships winners
Medalists at the 2007 Pan American Games
21st-century American women